Clément Carisey (born 22 March 1992) is a French cyclist, who currently rides for French amateur team Charvieu Chavagneux Isère Cyclisme.

Major results

2018
 10th Grand Prix de la Ville de Nogent-sur-Oise
2019
 7th Overall Circuit Cycliste Sarthe
 7th Rund um Köln
2021
 1st Stage 5 Tour Poitou-Charentes en Nouvelle-Aquitaine
 9th Overall Étoile de Bessèges
2022
 5th Overall Ronde de l'Oise

References

External links

1992 births
Living people
French male cyclists
People from Échirolles
Sportspeople from Isère
Cyclists from Auvergne-Rhône-Alpes